The Russo-Japanese War was fought between the Empire of Japan and the Russian Empire during 1904 and 1905 over rival imperial ambitions in Manchuria and the Korean Empire. The major theatres of military operations were in Liaodong Peninsula and Mukden in Southern Manchuria, and the Yellow Sea and the Sea of Japan.

Russia sought a warm-water port on the Pacific Ocean both for its navy and for maritime trade. Vladivostok remained ice-free and operational only during the summer; Port Arthur, a naval base in Liaodong Province leased to Russia by the Qing dynasty of China from 1897, was operational year round.

Russia had pursued an expansionist policy east of the Urals, in Siberia and the Far East, since the reign of Ivan the Terrible in the 16th century.
Since the end of the First Sino-Japanese War in 1895, Japan had feared Russian encroachment would interfere with its plans to establish a sphere of influence in Korea and Manchuria.

Seeing Russia as a rival, Japan offered to recognize Russian dominance in Manchuria in exchange for recognition of the Korean Empire as being within the Japanese sphere of influence. Russia refused and demanded the establishment of a neutral buffer zone between Russia and Japan in Korea, north of the 39th parallel. The Imperial Japanese Government perceived this as obstructing their plans for expansion into mainland Asia and chose to go to war.

Although Russia suffered a number of defeats, Emperor Nicholas II remained convinced that Russia could still win if it fought on; he chose to remain engaged in the war and await the outcomes of key naval battles. As hope of victory dissipated, he continued the war to preserve the dignity of Russia by averting a "humiliating peace". Russia ignored Japan's willingness early on to agree to an armistice and rejected the idea of bringing the dispute to the Permanent Court of Arbitration at the Hague. After the decisive naval battle of Tsushima, the war was concluded with the Treaty of Portsmouth, mediated by US President Theodore Roosevelt. The complete victory of the Japanese military surprised international observers and transformed the balance of power in both East Asia and Europe, resulting in Japan's emergence as a great power and a decline in the Russian Empire's prestige and influence in Europe. Russia's incurrence of substantial casualties and losses for a cause that resulted in humiliating defeat contributed to a growing domestic unrest which culminated in the 1905 Russian Revolution, and severely damaged the prestige of the Russian autocracy.

Historical background

Modernization of Japan 

After the Meiji Restoration in 1868, the Meiji government endeavoured to assimilate Western ideas, technological advances and ways of warfare. By the late 19th century, Japan had transformed itself into a modernized industrial state. The Japanese wanted to be recognized as equal with the Western powers. The Meiji Restoration had been intended to make Japan a modernized state, not a Westernized one, and Japan was an imperialist power, looking towards overseas expansionism.

In the years 1869–73, the Seikanron ("Conquer Korea Argument") had bitterly divided the Japanese elite: one faction wanted to conquer Korea immediately, another wanted to wait until Japan was further modernized before embarking on a war to conquer Korea; significantly, no one in the Japanese elite ever accepted the idea that the Koreans had the right to be independent, with only the question of timing dividing the two factions. In much the same way that Europeans used the "backwardness" of African and Asian nations as a reason for why they had to conquer them, for the Japanese elite the "backwardness" of China and Korea was proof of the inferiority of those nations, thus giving the Japanese the "right" to conquer them.

Count Inoue Kaoru, the Foreign Minister, gave a speech in 1887 saying "What we must do is to transform our empire and our people, make the empire like the countries of Europe and our people like the peoples of Europe," going on to say that the Chinese and Koreans had essentially forfeited their right to be independent by not modernizing. Much of the pressure for an aggressive foreign policy in Japan came from below, with the advocates of "people's rights" movement calling for an elected parliament also favouring an ultra-nationalist line that took it for granted the Japanese had the "right" to annex Korea, as the "people's rights" movement was led by those who favoured invading Korea in the years 1869–73.

As part of the modernization process in Japan, Social Darwinist ideas about the "survival of the fittest" were common in Japan from the 1880s onward and many ordinary Japanese resented the heavy taxes imposed by the government to modernize Japan, demanding something tangible like an overseas colony as a reward for their sacrifices.

Furthermore, the educational system of Meiji Japan was meant to train the schoolboys to be soldiers when they grew up, and as such, Japanese schools indoctrinated their students into Bushidō ("way of the warrior"), the fierce code of the samurai. Having indoctrinated the younger generations into Bushidō, the Meiji elite found themselves faced with a people who clamored for war, and regarded diplomacy as a weakness.

Pressure from the people 
The British Japanologist Richard Story wrote that the biggest misconception about Japan in the West was that the Japanese people were the "docile" instruments of the elite, when in fact much of the pressure for Japan's wars from 1894 to 1941 came from the ordinary people, who demanded a "tough" foreign policy, and tended to engage in riots and assassination when foreign policy was perceived to be pusillanimous.

Though the Meiji oligarchy refused to allow liberal democracy, they did seek to appropriate some of the demands of the "people's rights" movement by allowing an elected Imperial Diet in 1890 (with limited powers and an equally limited franchise) and by pursuing an aggressive foreign policy towards Korea.

In 1884, Japan had encouraged a coup in the Kingdom of Korea by a pro-Japanese reformist faction, which led to the conservative government calling upon China for help, leading to a clash between Chinese and Japanese soldiers in Seoul. At the time, Tokyo did not feel ready to risk a war with China, and the crisis was ended by the Convention of Tientsin, which left Korea more strongly in the Chinese sphere of influence, though it did give the Japanese the right to intervene in Korea. All through the 1880s and early 1890s, the government in Tokyo was regularly criticized for not being aggressive enough in Korea, leading Japanese historian Masao Maruyama to write: Just as Japan was subject to pressure from the Great Powers, so she would apply pressure to still weaker countries—a clear case of the transfer psychology. In this regard it is significant that ever since the Meiji period demands for a tough foreign policy have come from the common people, that is, from those who are at the receiving end of oppression at home.

Russian Eastern expansion 
Tsarist Russia, as a major imperial power, had ambitions in the East. By the 1890s it had extended its realm across Central Asia to Afghanistan, absorbing local states in the process. The Russian Empire stretched from Poland in the west to the Kamchatka Peninsula in the east. With its construction of the Trans-Siberian Railway to the port of Vladivostok, Russia hoped to further consolidate its influence and presence in the region. In the Tsushima incident of 1861 Russia had directly assaulted Japanese territory.

First Sino-Japanese War (1894–95) 

The first major war the Empire of Japan fought following the Meiji Restoration was against China, from 1894-1895. The war revolved around the issue of control and influence over Korea under the rule of the Joseon dynasty. From the 1880s onward, there had been vigorous competition for influence in Korea between China and Japan. The Korean court was prone to factionalism, and at the time was badly divided between a reformist camp that was pro-Japanese and a more conservative faction that was pro-Chinese. In 1884, a pro-Japanese coup attempt was put down by Chinese troops, and a "residency" under General Yuan Shikai was established in Seoul. A peasant rebellion led by the Tonghak religious movement led to a request by the Korean government for the Qing dynasty to send in troops to stabilize the country. The Empire of Japan responded by sending their own force to Korea to crush the Tonghak and installed a puppet government in Seoul. China objected and war ensued. Hostilities proved brief, with Japanese ground troops routing Chinese forces on the Liaodong Peninsula and nearly destroying the Chinese Beiyang Fleet in the Battle of the Yalu River. Japan and China signed the Treaty of Shimonoseki, which ceded the Liaodong Peninsula and the island of Taiwan to Japan. After the peace treaty, Russia, Germany, and France forced Japan to withdraw from the Liaodong Peninsula. The leaders of Japan did not feel that they possessed the strength to resist the combined might of Russia, Germany and France, and so gave in to the ultimatum. At the same time, the Japanese did not abandon their attempts to force Korea into the Japanese sphere of influence. On 8 October 1895, Queen Min of Korea, the leader of the anti-Japanese and pro-Chinese faction at the Korean court was murdered by Japanese agents within the halls of the Gyeongbokgung palace, an act that backfired badly as it turned Korean public opinion against Japan. In early 1896, King Gojong of Korea fled to the Russian legation in Seoul, believing that his life was in danger from Japanese agents, and Russian influence in Korea started to predominate. In the aftermath of the flight of the king, a popular uprising overthrew the pro-Japanese government and several cabinet ministers were lynched on the streets.

In 1897, Russia occupied the Liaodong Peninsula, built the Port Arthur fortress, and based the Russian Pacific Fleet in the port. Russia's acquisition of Port Arthur was primarily an anti-British move to counter the British occupation of Wei-hai-Wei, but in Japan, this was perceived as an anti-Japanese move. Germany occupied Jiaozhou Bay, built the Tsingtao fortress, and based the German East Asia Squadron in this port. Between 1897 and 1903, the Russians built the Chinese Eastern Railway (CER) in Manchuria. The Chinese Eastern Railroad was owned jointly by the Russian and Chinese governments, but the company's management was entirely Russian, the line was built to the Russian gauge and Russian troops were stationed in Manchuria to protect rail traffic on the CER from bandit attacks. The headquarters of the CER company was located in the new Russian-built city of Harbin, the "Moscow of the Orient". From 1897 onwards, Manchuria—while still nominally part of the "Great Qing Empire"—started to resemble more and more a Russian province.

Russian encroachment 
In December 1897, a Russian fleet appeared off Port Arthur. After three months, in 1898, China and Russia negotiated a convention by which China leased (to Russia) Port Arthur, Talienwan and the surrounding waters. The two parties further agreed that the convention could be extended by mutual agreement. The Russians clearly expected such an extension, for they lost no time in occupying the territory and in fortifying Port Arthur, their sole warm-water port on the Pacific coast and of great strategic value. A year later, to consolidate their position, the Russians began to build a new railway from Harbin through Mukden to Port Arthur, the South Manchurian Railroad. The development of the railway became a contributory factor to the Boxer Rebellion, when Boxer forces burned the railway stations.

The Russians also began to make inroads into Korea. A large point of Russia's growing influence in Korea was Gojong's internal exile to the Russian legation. A pro-Russian cabinet emerged in the Korean Empire. In 1901, Tsar Nicholas II told Prince Henry of Prussia, "I do not want to seize Korea but under no circumstances can I allow Japan to become firmly established there. That will be a casus belli." By 1898 they had acquired mining and forestry concessions near the Yalu and Tumen rivers, causing the Japanese much anxiety. Japan decided to attack before the Russians completed the Trans-Siberian Railway.

Boxer Rebellion 

The Russians and the Japanese both contributed troops to the Eight-Nation Alliance sent in 1900 to quell the Boxer Rebellion and to relieve the international legations besieged in the Chinese capital, Beijing. Russia had already sent 177,000 soldiers to Manchuria, nominally to protect its railways under construction. Though the Qing imperial army and the Boxer rebels united to fight against the invasion, they were quickly overrun and ejected from Manchuria. After the Boxer Rebellion, 100,000 Russian soldiers were stationed in Manchuria. The Russian troops settled in and despite assurances they would vacate the area after the crisis, by 1903 the Russians had not established a timetable for withdrawal and had actually strengthened their position in Manchuria.

Pre-war negotiations 
The Japanese statesman Itō Hirobumi started to negotiate with the Russians. He regarded Japan as too weak to evict the Russians militarily, so he proposed giving Russia control over Manchuria in exchange for Japanese control of northern Korea. Of the five Genrō (elder statesmen) who made up the Meiji oligarchy, Itō Hirobumi and Count Inoue Kaoru opposed the idea of war against Russia on financial grounds, while Katsura Tarō, Komura Jutarō and Field Marshal Yamagata Aritomo favored war. Meanwhile, Japan and Britain had signed the Anglo-Japanese Alliance in 1902 – the British seeking to restrict naval competition by keeping the Russian Pacific seaports of Vladivostok and Port Arthur from their full use. Japan's alliance with the British meant, in part, that if any nation allied itself with Russia during any war against Japan, then Britain would enter the war on Japan's side. Russia could no longer count on receiving help from either Germany or France without the danger of British involvement in the war. With such an alliance, Japan felt free to commence hostilities if necessary.

The 1890s and 1900s marked the height of the "Yellow Peril" propaganda by the German government, and the German Emperor Wilhelm II often wrote letters to his cousin Emperor Nicholas II of Russia, praising him as the "saviour of the white race" and urging Russia forward in Asia. From November 1894 onward, Wilhelm had been writing letters praising Nicholas as Europe's defender from the "Yellow Peril", assuring the Tsar that God Himself had "chosen" Russia to defend Europe from the alleged Asian threat. On 1 November 1902 Wilhelm wrote to Nicholas that "certain symptoms in the East seem to show that Japan is becoming a rather restless customer" and "it is evident to every unbiased mind that Korea must and will be Russian". Wilhelm ended his letter with the warning that Japan and China would soon unite against Europe, writing: "Twenty to thirty million Chinese, supported by a half dozen Japanese divisions, led by competent, intrepid Japanese officers, full of hatred for Christianity—that is a vision of the future that cannot be contemplated without concern, and it is not impossible. On the contrary, it is the realisation of the yellow peril, which I described a few years ago and I was ridiculed by the majority of people for my graphic depiction of it ... Your devoted friend and cousin, Willy, Admiral of the Atlantic".

Wilhelm aggressively encouraged Russia's ambitions in Asia because France, Russia's closest ally since 1894, was less than supportive of Russian expansionism in Asia, and it was believed in Berlin that German support of Russia might break up the Franco-Russian alliance and lead to a new German–Russian alliance.
The French had made it clear that they disapproved of Nicholas's forward policy in Asia; the French Premier Maurice Rouvier (in office: May to December 1887) publicly declaring that the Franco-Russian alliance applied only in Europe, not to Asia,
and that France would remain neutral if Japan attacked Russia. The American president Theodore Roosevelt (in office 1901–1909), who was attempting to mediate the Russian–Japanese dispute, complained that Wilhelm's "Yellow Peril" propaganda, which strongly implied that Germany might go to war against Japan in support of Russia, encouraged Russian intransigence. On 24 July 1905, in a letter to the British diplomat Cecil Spring Rice, Roosevelt wrote that Wilhelm bore partial responsibility for the war as "he has done all he could to bring it about", charging that Wilhelm's constant warnings about the "Yellow Peril" had made the Russians uninterested in compromise as Nicholas believed that Germany would intervene if Japan attacked.

The implicit promise of German support suggested by Wilhelm's "Yellow Peril" speeches and letters to Nicholas led many decision-makers in Saint Petersburg to believe that Russia's military weaknesses in the Far East (like the uncompleted Trans-Siberian railroad line) did not matter—they assumed that the Reich would come to Russia's assistance if war should come. In fact, neither Wilhelm nor his Chancellor Prince Bernhard von Bülow (in office: 1900–1909) had much interest in East Asia, and Wilhelm's letters to Nicholas praising him as Europe's saviour against the "Yellow Peril" were really meant to provoke change in the balance of power in Europe, as Wilhelm believed that any Russian entanglement with Japan would break up the Franco-Russian alliance and lead to Nicholas signing an alliance with Germany. This was especially the case as Germany had embarked upon the "Tirpitz Plan" and a policy of Weltpolitik (from 1897) meant to challenge Britain's position as the world's leading power. Since Britain was allied to Japan, then if Germany could manipulate Russia and Japan into going to war with each other, this in turn would allegedly lead to Russia turning towards Germany.

Furthermore, Wilhelm believed if a Russian–German alliance emerged, France would be compelled to join it. He also hoped that having Russia pursue an expansionist policy in Asia would distract and keep Russia out of the Balkans, thus removing the main source of tension between Russia and Germany's ally Austria-Hungary. During the war, Nicholas, who took at face value Wilhelm's "Yellow Peril" speeches, placed much hope in German intervention on his side. More than once Nicholas chose to continue the war out of the belief that the Kaiser would come to his aid.

Despite previous assurances that Russia would completely withdraw from Manchuria the forces it had sent to crush the Boxer Rebellion by 8 April 1903, that day passed with no reduction in Russian forces in that region. In Japan, university students demonstrated both against Russia and against their own government for not taking any action. On 28 July 1903 Kurino Shin'ichirō, the Japanese minister in Saint Petersburg, was instructed to present his country's view opposing Russia's consolidation plans in Manchuria. On 3 August 1903 the Japanese minister handed in the following document to serve as the basis for further negotiations:
 Mutual engagement to respect the independence and territorial integrity of the Chinese and Korean empires and to maintain the principle of equal opportunity for the commerce and industry of all nations in those countries.
 Reciprocal recognition of Japan's preponderating interests in Korea and Russia's special interests in railway enterprises in Manchuria, and of the right of Japan to take in Korea and of Russia to take in Manchuria such measures as may be necessary for the protection of their respective interests as above defined, subject, however, to the provisions of article I of this agreement.
 Reciprocal undertaking on the part of Russia and Japan not to impede development of those industrial and commercial activities respectively of Japan in Korea and of Russia in Manchuria, which are not inconsistent with the stipulations of article I of this agreement. Additional engagement on the part of Russia not to impede the eventual extension of the Korean railway into southern Manchuria so as to connect with the East China and Shan-hai-kwan–Newchwang lines.
 Reciprocal engagement that in case it is found necessary to send troops by Japan to Korea, or by Russia to Manchuria, for the purpose either of protecting the interests mentioned in article II of this agreement, or of suppressing insurrection or disorder calculated to create international complications, the troops so sent are in no case to exceed the actual number required and are to be forthwith recalled as soon as their missions are accomplished.
 Recognition on the part of Russia of the exclusive right of Japan to give advice and assistance in the interest of reform and good government in Korea, including necessary military assistance.
 This agreement to supplant all previous arrangements between Japan and Russia respecting Korea.
On 3 October 1903 the Russian minister to Japan, Roman Rosen, presented to the Japanese government the Russian counter proposal as the basis of negotiations, as follows:
 Mutual engagement to respect the independence and territorial integrity of the Korean Empire.
 Recognition by Russia of Japan's preponderating interests in Korea and of the right of Japan to give advice and assistance to Korea tending to improve the civil administration of the empire without infringing the stipulations of article I.
 Engagement on the part of Russia not to impede the commercial and industrial undertakings of Japan in Korea, nor to oppose any measures taken for the purpose of protecting them so long as such measures do not infringe the stipulations of article I.
 Recognition of the right of Japan to send for the same purpose troops to Korea, with the knowledge of Russia, but their number not to exceed that actually required, and with the engagement on the part of Japan to recall such troops as soon as their mission is accomplished.
 Mutual engagement not to use any part of the territory of Korea for strategical purposes nor to undertake on the coasts of Korea any military works capable of menacing the freedom of navigation in the Straits of Korea.
 Mutual engagement to consider that part of the territory of Korea lying to the north of the 39th parallel as a neutral zone into which neither of the contracting parties shall introduce troops.
 Recognition by Japan of Manchuria and its littoral as in all respects outside her sphere of interest.
 This agreement to supplant all previous agreements between Russia and Japan respecting Korea.

During the Russian–Japanese talks, the Japanese historian Hirono Yoshihiko noted, "once negotiations commenced between Japan and Russia, Russia scaled back its demands and claims regarding Korea bit by bit, making a series of concessions that Japan regarded as serious compromises on Russia's part". The war might not have broken out had not the issues of Korea and Manchuria become linked. The Korean and Manchurian issues had become linked as the Prime Minister of Japan, Katsura Tarō (in office 1901–1906), decided if war did come, that Japan was more likely to have the support of the United States and Great Britain if the war could be presented as a struggle for free trade against the highly protectionist Russian empire, in which case, Manchuria, which was the larger market than Korea, was more likely to engage Anglo-American sympathies. Throughout the war, Japanese propaganda presented the recurring theme of Japan as a "civilized" power (that supported free trade and would implicitly allow foreign businesses into the resource-rich region of Manchuria) vs. Russia the "uncivilized" power (that was protectionist and wanted to keep the riches of Manchuria all to itself).

Emperor Gojong of Korea (King from 1864 to 1897, Emperor from 1897 to 1907) came to believe that the issue dividing Japan and Russia was Manchuria, and chose to pursue a policy of neutrality as the best way of preserving Korean independence as the crisis mounted. In a series of reports to Beijing, Hu Weide, the Chinese ambassador in Saint Petersburg from July 1902 to September 1907, looked closely at whether a Russian or a Japanese victory would be favourable to China, and argued that the latter was preferable, as he maintained a Japanese victory presented the better chance for China to regain sovereignty over Manchuria. In December 1903 China decided to remain neutral if war came, because though Japan was the only power capable of evicting Russia from Manchuria, the extent of Japanese ambitions in Manchuria was not clear to Beijing.

Russian–Japanese negotiations then followed, although by early January 1904 the Japanese government had realised that Russia was not interested in settling the Manchurian or Korean issues. Instead, Russia's goal was buying time—via diplomacy—to further build up militarily. In December 1903, Wilhelm wrote in a marginal note on a diplomatic dispatch about his role in inflaming Russo-Japanese relations:Since 97—Kiaochow—we have never left Russia in any doubt that we would cover her back in Europe, in case she decided to pursue a bigger policy in the Far East that might lead to military complications (with the aim of relieving our eastern border from the fearful pressure and threat of the massive Russian army!). Whereupon, Russia took Port Arthur and trusting us, took her fleet out of the Baltic, thereby making herself vulnerable to us by sea. In Danzig 01 and Reval 02, the same assurance was given again, with result that entire Russian divisions from Poland and European Russia were and are being sent to the Far East. This would not had happened if our governments had not been in agreement!
A recurring theme of Wilhelm's letters to Nicholas was that "Holy Russia" had been "chosen" by God to save the "entire white race" from the "Yellow Peril", and that Russia was "entitled" to annex all of Korea, Manchuria, and northern China up to Beijing. Wilhelm went on to assure Nicholas that once Russia had defeated Japan, this would be a deadly blow to British diplomacy, and that the two emperors, the self-proclaimed "Admiral of the Atlantic" and the "Admiral of the Pacific", would rule Eurasia together, making them able to challenge British sea power as the resources of Eurasia would make their empires immune to a British blockade, and thus allowing Germany and Russia to "divide up the best" of the British colonies in Asia between them.

Nicholas had been prepared to compromise with Japan, but after receiving a letter from Wilhelm attacking him as a coward for his willingness to compromise with the Japanese (who, Wilhelm never ceasing reminding Nicholas, represented the "Yellow Peril") for the sake of peace, became more obstinate. Wilhelm had written to Nicholas stating that the question of Russian interests in Manchuria and Korea was beside the point, saying instead it was a matter of Russiaundertaking the protection and defence of the White Race, and with it, Christian civilization, against the Yellow Race. And whatever the Japs are determined to ensure the domination of the Yellow Race in East Asia, to put themselves at its head and organise and lead it into battle against the White Race. That is the kernel of the situation, and therefore there can be very little doubt about where the sympathies of all half-way intelligent Europeans should lie. England betrayed Europe's interests to America in a cowardly and shameful way over the Panama Canal question, so as to be left in 'peace' by the Yankees. Will the 'Tsar' likewise betray the interests of the White Race to the Yellow as to be 'left in peace' and not embarrass the Hague tribunal too much?.
When Nicholas replied that he still wanted peace, Wilhelm wrote back in a telegram "You innocent angel!", telling his advisors "This is the language of an innocent angel. But not that of a White Tsar!" Nevertheless, Tokyo believed that Russia was not serious about seeking a peaceful solution to the dispute. On 13 January 1904, Japan proposed a formula by which Manchuria would remain outside Japan's sphere of influence and, reciprocally, Korea outside Russia's. On 21 December 1903, the Tarō cabinet voted to go to war against Russia.

By 4 February 1904, no formal reply had been received from Saint Petersburg. On 6 February the Japanese minister to Russia, Kurino Shin'ichirō, was recalled, and Japan severed diplomatic relations with Russia.

Potential diplomatic resolution of territorial concerns between Japan and Russia failed; historians have argued that this directly resulted from the actions of Emperor Nicholas II. Crucially, Nicholas mismanaged his government. Although certain scholars contend that the situation arose from the determination of Nicholas II to use the war against Japan to spark a revival in Russian patriotism, no historical evidence supports this claim. The Tsar's advisors did not support the war, foreseeing problems in transporting troops and supplies from European Russia to the East. The Tsar himself repeatedly delayed negotiations with the Japanese government as he believed that he was protected by God and the autocracy. The Japanese understanding of this can be seen in a telegram from Japanese minister of foreign affairs, Komura, to the minister to Russia, in which he stated:
... the Japanese government have at all times during the progress of the negotiations made it a special point to give prompt answers to all propositions of the Russian government. The negotiations have now been pending for no less than four months, and they have not yet reached a stage where the final issue can with certainty be predicted. In these circumstances the Japanese government cannot but regard with grave concern the situation for which the delays in negotiations are largely responsible.
Some scholars have suggested that Nicholas II dragged Japan into war intentionally, in hopes of reviving Russian nationalism. This notion conflicts with a comment made by Nicholas to Kaiser Wilhelm of Germany, saying there would be no war because he "did not wish it".
This does not reject the claim that Russia played an aggressive role in the East, which it did; rather, it means that Russia unwisely calculated and supposed that Japan would not go to war against Russia's far larger and seemingly superior navy and army. Nicholas held the Japanese in contempt as "yellow monkeys", and he took for granted that the Japanese would simply yield in the face of Russia's superior power, which thus explains his unwillingness to compromise. Evidence of Russia's false sense of security and superiority to Japan is seen by Russian reference to Japan's choosing war as a big mistake.

Declaration of war 

Japan issued a declaration of war on 8 February 1904. However, three hours before Japan's declaration of war was received by the Russian government, and without warning, the Imperial Japanese Navy attacked the Russian Far East Fleet at Port Arthur.

Tsar Nicholas II was stunned by news of the attack. He could not believe that Japan would commit an act of war without a formal declaration, and had been assured by his ministers that the Japanese would not fight. When the attack came, according to Cecil Spring Rice, first secretary at the British Embassy, it left the Tsar "almost incredulous".

Russia declared war on Japan eight days later. Japan, in response, made reference to the Russian attack on Sweden in 1808 without declaration of war, although the requirement to mediate disputes between states before commencing hostilities was made international law in 1899, and again in 1907, with the Hague Conventions of 1899 and 1907.

The Qing Empire favoured the Japanese position and even offered military aid, but Japan declined it. However, Yuan Shikai sent envoys to Japanese generals several times to deliver foodstuffs and alcoholic drinks. Native Manchurians joined the war on both sides as hired troops.

Campaign of 1904 
Port Arthur, on the Liaodong Peninsula in the south of Manchuria, had been fortified into a major naval base by the Russian Imperial Army. Since it needed to control the sea in order to fight a war on the Asian mainland, Japan's first military objective was to neutralize the Russian fleet at Port Arthur.

Battle of Port Arthur 

On the night of 8 February 1904, the Japanese fleet under Admiral Tōgō Heihachirō opened the war with a surprise torpedo boat destroyer attack on the Russian ships at Port Arthur. These attacks developed into the Battle of Port Arthur the next morning. A series of indecisive naval engagements followed, in which Admiral Tōgō was unable to attack the Russian fleet successfully as it was protected by the shore batteries of the harbour, and the Russians were reluctant to leave the harbour for the open seas, especially after the death of Admiral Stepan Osipovich Makarov from a naval mine on 13 April 1904. Although the actual Battle of Port Arthur was indecisive, the initial attacks had a devastating psychological effect on Russia, which had been confident about the prospect of war. The Japanese had seized the initiative while the Russians waited in port.

These engagements provided cover for a Japanese landing near Incheon in Korea. From Incheon the Japanese occupied Hanseong and then the rest of Korea. After the Japanese occupation of Hanseong, Emperor Gojong sent a detachment of 17,000 soldiers to support Russia. By the end of April, the Japanese Imperial Army under Kuroki Tamemoto was ready to cross the Yalu River into Russian-occupied Manchuria.

Blockade of Port Arthur 

The Japanese attempted to deny the Russians use of Port Arthur. During the night of 13–14 February, the Japanese attempted to block the entrance to Port Arthur by sinking several concrete-filled steamers in the deep water channel to the port, but they sank too deep to be effective. A similar attempt to block the harbour entrance during the night of 3–4 May also failed. In March, the charismatic Vice Admiral Makarov had taken command of the First Russian Pacific Squadron with the intention of breaking out of the Port Arthur blockade.

The Petropavlovsk sank almost immediately, while the Pobeda had to be towed back to port for extensive repairs. Admiral Makarov, the single most effective Russian naval strategist of the war, died on the battleship Petropavlovsk.

On 15 April 1904, the Russian government made overtures threatening to seize the British war correspondents who were taking the ship  into war zones to report for the London-based Times newspaper, citing concerns about the possibility of the British giving away Russian positions to the Japanese fleet.

The Russians quickly learned, and soon employed, the Japanese tactic of offensive minelaying. The Hatsuse sank within minutes, taking 450 sailors with her, while the Yashima sank while under tow towards Korea for repairs. On 23 June 1904, a breakout attempt by the Russian squadron, now under the command of Admiral Wilgelm Vitgeft, failed. By the end of the month, Japanese artillery were firing shells into the harbour.

Siege of Port Arthur 

The siege of Port Arthur commenced in April 1904. Japanese troops tried numerous frontal assaults on the fortified hilltops overlooking the harbour, which were defeated with Japanese casualties in the thousands. With the aid of several batteries of 11-inch (280 mm) howitzers, the Japanese were eventually able to capture the key hilltop bastion in December 1904. With a spotter at the end of a phone line located at this vantage point, the long-range artillery was able to shell the Russian fleet, which was unable to retaliate against the land-based artillery invisible over the other side of hilltop, and was unable or unwilling to sail out against the blockading fleet. Four Russian battleships and two cruisers were sunk in succession, with the fifth and last battleship being forced to scuttle a few weeks later. Thus, all capital ships of the Russian fleet in the Pacific were sunk. This is probably the only example in military history when such a scale of devastation was achieved by land-based artillery against major warships.

Meanwhile, attempts to relieve the besieged city by land also failed, and, after the Battle of Liaoyang in late August, the northern Russian force that might have been able to relieve Port Arthur retreated to Mukden (Shenyang). Major General Anatoly Stessel, commander of the Port Arthur garrison, believed that the purpose of defending the city was lost after the fleet had been destroyed. In general, the Russian defenders were suffering disproportionate casualties each time the Japanese attacked. In particular, several large underground mines were exploded in late December, resulting in the costly capture of a few more pieces of the defensive line.  Stessel, therefore, decided to surrender to the surprised Japanese generals on 2 January 1905. He made his decision without consulting either the other military staff present, or the Tsar and military command, all of whom disagreed with the decision. Stessel was convicted by a court-martial in 1908 and sentenced to death on account of an incompetent defense and for disobeying orders. He was later pardoned.

Anglo–Japanese intelligence co-operation 
Even before the war, British and Japanese intelligence had co-operated against Russia due to the Anglo-Japanese Alliance. During the war, Indian Army stations in Malaya and China often intercepted and read wireless and telegraph cable traffic relating to the war, which was shared with the Japanese. In their turn, the Japanese shared information about Russia with the British with one British official writing of the "perfect quality" of Japanese intelligence. In particular, British and Japanese intelligence gathered much evidence that Germany was supporting Russia in the war as part of a bid to disturb the balance of power in Europe, which led to British officials increasingly perceiving that country  as a threat to the international order.

Battle of Yalu River 

In contrast to the Japanese strategy of rapidly gaining ground to control Manchuria, Russian strategy focused on fighting delaying actions to gain time for reinforcements to arrive via the long Trans-Siberian Railway, which was incomplete near Irkutsk at the time. On 1 May 1904, the Battle of Yalu River became the first major land battle of the war; Japanese troops stormed a Russian position after crossing the river. The defeat of the Russian Eastern Detachment removed the perception that the Japanese would be an easy enemy, that the war would be short, and that Russia would be the overwhelming victor. This was also the first battle in decades to be an Asian victory over a European power and marked Russia's inability to match Japan's military prowess. Japanese troops proceeded to land at several points on the Manchurian coast, and in a series of engagements, drove the Russians back towards Port Arthur. The subsequent battles, including the Battle of Nanshan on 25 May 1904, were marked by heavy Japanese losses largely from attacking entrenched Russian positions.

Battle of the Yellow Sea 

With the death of Admiral Stepan Makarov during the siege of Port Arthur in April 1904, Admiral Wilgelm Vitgeft was appointed commander of the battle fleet and was ordered to make a sortie from Port Arthur and deploy his force to Vladivostok. Flying his flag in the French-built pre-dreadnought , Vitgeft proceeded to lead his six battleships, four cruisers, and 14 torpedo boat destroyers into the Yellow Sea in the early morning of 10 August 1904. Waiting for him was Admiral Tōgō and his fleet of four battleships, 10 cruisers, and 18 torpedo boat destroyers.

At approximately 12:15, the battleship fleets obtained visual contact with each other, and at 13:00 with Tōgō crossing Vitgeft's T, they commenced main battery fire at a range of about eight miles, the longest ever conducted up to that time. For about thirty minutes the battleships pounded one another until they had closed to less than four miles and began to bring their secondary batteries into play. At 18:30, a hit from one of Tōgō's battleships struck Vitgeft's flagship's bridge, killing him instantly.

With the Tsesarevichs helm jammed and their admiral killed in action, she turned from her battle line, causing confusion among her fleet. However, Tōgō was determined to sink the Russian flagship and continued pounding her, and it was saved only by the gallant charge of the American-built , whose captain successfully drew away Tōgō's heavy fire from the Russian flagship. Knowing of the impending battle with the battleship reinforcements arriving from Russia (the Baltic Fleet), Tōgō chose not to risk his battleships by pursuing his enemy as they turned about and headed back into Port Arthur, thus ending naval history's longest-range gunnery duel up to that time and the first modern clash of steel battleship fleets on the high seas.

Baltic Fleet redeploys 

Meanwhile, the Russians were preparing to reinforce their Far East Fleet by sending the Baltic Fleet, under the command of Admiral Zinovy Rozhestvensky. After a false start caused by engine problems and other mishaps, the squadron finally departed on 15 October 1904, and sailed halfway around the world from the Baltic Sea to the Pacific via the Cape Route around the Cape of Good Hope in the course of a seven-month odyssey that was to attract worldwide attention. The Dogger Bank incident on 21 October 1904, where the Russian fleet fired on British fishing boats that they mistook for enemy torpedo boats, nearly sparked a war with the United Kingdom (an ally of Japan, but neutral, unless provoked). During the voyage, the fleet separated into a portion that went through the Suez Canal while the larger battleships went around the Cape of Good Hope.

Effects on civilians 
It was reported in 1905 that many Russian females were raped by Japanese troops, causing a widespread infections of venereal diseases in large number of Japanese troops. During the fighting in Manchuria, there were Russian troops that looted and burned some Chinese villages, raped women and often killed those who resisted or did not understand what they wanted. The Russian justification for all this was that Chinese civilians, being Asian, must have been helping their fellow Asians (the Japanese) inflict defeat on the Russians, and therefore deserved to be punished. The Russian troops were gripped by the fear of the "Yellow Peril", and saw all Asians, not just the Japanese, as the enemy. All of the Russian soldiers were much feared by the Chinese population of Manchuria, but it was the Cossacks whom they feared the most on the account of their brutality and insatiable desire to loot. Largely because of the more disciplined behavior of the Japanese, the Han and Manchu population of Manchuria tended to be pro-Japanese. The Japanese were also prone to looting, albeit in a considerably less brutal manner than the Russians, and summarily executed any Chinese or Manchu whom they suspected of being spies. The city of Liaoyang had the misfortune to be sacked three times within three days: first by the Russians, then by the Chinese police, and finally by the Japanese.

The Japanese hired Chinese bandits known variously as the Chunguses, Chunchuse or khunhuzy to engage in guerrilla warfare by attacking Russian supply columns. Only once did the Chunguses attack Japanese forces, and that attack was apparently motivated by the Chunguses mistaking the Japanese forces for a Russian one. Zhang Zuolin, a prominent bandit leader and the future "Old Marshal" who would rule Manchuria as a warlord between 1916 and 1928, worked as a Chunguse for the Japanese. Manchuria was still officially part of the Chinese Empire, and the Chinese civil servants tried their best to be neutral as Russian and Japanese troops marched across Manchuria. In the parts of Manchuria occupied by the Japanese, Tokyo appointed "civil governors" who worked to improve health, sanitation and the state of the roads. These activities were also self-interested, as improved roads lessened Japanese logistics problems while improved health amongst the Chinese lessened the dangers of diseases infecting the Japanese troops. By contrast, the Russians made no effort to improve sanitation or health amongst the Chinese, and destroyed everything when they retreated. Many Chinese tended to see the Japanese as the lesser evil.

Campaign of 1905 

With the fall of Port Arthur, the Japanese 3rd Army could continue northward to reinforce positions south of Russian-held Mukden. With the onset of the severe Manchurian winter, there had been no major land engagements since the Battle of Shaho the previous year.

Battle of Sandepu 

The Russian Second Army under General Oskar Gripenberg, between 25 and 29 January, attacked the Japanese left flank near the town of Sandepu, almost breaking through. This caught the Japanese by surprise. However, without support from other Russian units the attack stalled, Gripenberg was ordered to halt by Kuropatkin and the battle was inconclusive. The Japanese knew that they needed to destroy the Russian army in Manchuria before Russian reinforcements arrived via the Trans-Siberian railroad.

Battle of Mukden 

The Battle of Mukden commenced on 20 February 1905. In the following days Japanese forces proceeded to assault the right and left flanks of Russian forces surrounding Mukden, along a  front. Approximately half a million men were involved in the fighting. Both sides were well entrenched and were backed by hundreds of artillery pieces. After days of harsh fighting, added pressure from the flanks forced both ends of the Russian defensive line to curve backwards. Seeing they were about to be encircled, the Russians began a general retreat, fighting a series of fierce rearguard actions, which soon deteriorated in the confusion and collapse of Russian forces. On 10 March 1905, after three weeks of fighting, General Kuropatkin decided to withdraw to the north of Mukden. The Russians suffered a estimated 90,000 casualties in the battle.

The retreating Russian Manchurian Army formations disbanded as fighting units, but the Japanese failed to destroy them completely. The Japanese themselves had suffered heavy casualties and were in no condition to pursue. Although the Battle of Mukden was a major defeat for the Russians and was the most decisive land battle ever fought by the Japanese, the final victory still depended on the navy.

Battle of Tsushima 

After a stopover of several weeks at the minor port of Nossi-Bé, Madagascar, that had been reluctantly allowed by neutral France in order not to jeopardize its relations with its Russian ally, the Russian Baltic fleet proceeded to Cam Ranh Bay in French Indochina passing on its way through the Singapore Strait between 7 and 10 April 1905. The fleet finally reached the Sea of Japan in May 1905. The logistics of such an undertaking in the age of coal power was astounding. The squadron required approximately 500,000 tons of coal to complete the journey, yet by international law, it was not allowed to coal at neutral ports, forcing the Russian authorities to acquire a large fleet of colliers to supply the fleet at sea. The weight of the ships' stores needed for such a long journey was to be another major problem.
The Russian Second Pacific Squadron (the renamed Baltic Fleet) sailed 18,000 nautical miles (33,000 km) to relieve Port Arthur only to hear the demoralizing news that Port Arthur had fallen while it was still at Madagascar. Admiral Rozhestvensky's only hope now was to reach the port of Vladivostok. There were three routes to Vladivostok, with the shortest and most direct passing through Tsushima Strait between Korea and Japan. However, this was also the most dangerous route as it passed between the Japanese home islands and the Japanese naval bases in Korea.

Admiral Tōgō was aware of Russian progress and understood that, with the fall of Port Arthur, the Second and Third Pacific squadrons would try to reach the only other Russian port in the Far East, Vladivostok. Battle plans were laid down and ships were repaired and refitted to intercept the Russian fleet.

The Japanese Combined Fleet, which had originally consisted of six battleships, was now down to four battleships and one second class battleship (two had been lost to mines), but still retained its cruisers, destroyers, and torpedo boats.

By the end of May, the Second Pacific Squadron was on the last leg of its journey to Vladivostok, taking the shorter, riskier route between Korea and Japan, and travelling at night to avoid discovery. Unfortunately for the Russians, while in compliance with the rules of war, the two trailing hospital ships had continued to burn their lights, which were spotted by the Japanese armed merchant cruiser Shinano Maru. Wireless communication was used to inform Togo's headquarters, where the Combined Fleet was immediately ordered to sortie. Still receiving reports from scouting forces, the Japanese were able to position their fleet to "cross the T" of the Russian fleet. The Japanese engaged the Russians in the Tsushima Straits on 27–28 May 1905. The Russian fleet was virtually annihilated, losing eight battleships, numerous smaller vessels, and more than 5,000 men, while the Japanese lost three torpedo boats and 116 men. Only three Russian vessels escaped to Vladivostok, while six others were interned in neutral ports. After the Battle of Tsushima, a combined Japanese Army and Navy operation occupied Sakhalin Island to force the Russians into suing for peace.

Peace and aftermath

Treaty of Portsmouth 

Military leaders and senior tsarist officials agreed before the war that Russia was a much stronger nation and had little to fear from the Empire of Japan. The fanatical zeal of the Japanese infantrymen astonished the Russians, who were dismayed by the apathy, backwardness, and defeatism of their own soldiers. The defeats of the Army and Navy shook Russian confidence. Throughout 1905, the Imperial Russian government was rocked by revolution. The population was against escalation of the war. The empire was certainly capable of sending more troops but this would make little difference in the outcome due to the poor state of the economy, the embarrassing defeats of the Russian Army and Navy by the Japanese, and the relative unimportance to Russia of the disputed land made the war extremely unpopular. Tsar Nicholas II elected to negotiate peace so he could concentrate on internal matters after the disaster of Bloody Sunday on 9 January 1905.

Both sides accepted the offer of United States President Theodore Roosevelt to mediate. Meetings were held in Portsmouth, New Hampshire, with Sergei Witte leading the Russian delegation and Baron Komura leading the Japanese delegation. The Treaty of Portsmouth was signed on 5 September 1905 at the Portsmouth Naval Shipyard. Witte became Russian Prime Minister the same year.

After courting the Japanese, Roosevelt decided to support the Tsar's refusal to pay indemnities, a move that policymakers in Tokyo interpreted as signifying that the United States had more than a passing interest in Asian affairs. Russia recognized Korea as part of the Japanese sphere of influence and agreed to evacuate Manchuria. Japan would annex Korea in 1910 (Japan–Korea Treaty of 1910), with scant protest from other powers. From 1910 forward, the Japanese adopted a strategy of using the Korean Peninsula as a gateway to the Asian continent and making Korea's economy subordinate to Japanese economic interests.

Russia also signed over its 25-year leasehold rights to Port Arthur, including the naval base and the peninsula around it, and ceded the southern half of Sakhalin Island to Japan. Sakhalin would be taken back by the Soviet Union following the defeat of the Japanese in World War II.

Roosevelt earned the Nobel Peace Prize for his effort. George E. Mowry concludes that Roosevelt handled the arbitration well, doing an "excellent job of balancing Russian and Japanese power in the Orient, where the supremacy of either constituted a threat to growing America". As Japan had won every battle on land and sea and as the Japanese people did not understand that the costs of the war had pushed their nation to the verge of bankruptcy, the Japanese public was enraged by the Treaty of Portsmouth as many Japanese had expected the war to end with Russia ceding the Russian Far East to Japan and for Russia to pay an indemnity. The United States was widely blamed in Japan for the Treaty of Portsmouth with Roosevelt having allegedly "cheated" Japan out of its rightful claims at the peace conference. On 5 September 1905 the Hibiya incendiary incident - as the anti-American riots were euphemistically described - erupted in Tokyo and lasted for three days, forcing the government to declare martial law.

Casualties 

Sources do not agree on a precise number of deaths from the war because of a lack of body counts for confirmation. The number of Japanese Army dead in combat or died of wounds is put at around 59,000 with around 27,000 additional casualties from disease, and between 6,000 and 12,000 wounded. Estimates of Russian Army dead range from around 34,000 to around 53,000 men with a further 9,000–19,000 dying of disease and around 75,000 captured. The total number of dead for both sides is generally stated as around 130,000 to 170,000. China suffered 20,000 civilian deaths, and financially the loss amounted to over 69 million taels' worth of silver.

During many of the battles at sea, several thousand soldiers being transported drowned after their ships went down. There was no consensus about what to do with transported soldiers at sea, and as a result, many of the ships failed or refused to rescue soldiers that were left shipwrecked. This led to the creation of the second Geneva Convention in 1906, which gave protection and care for shipwrecked soldiers in armed conflict.

Political consequences 

This was the first major military victory in the modern era of an Asian power over a European nation. Russia's defeat was met with shock in the West and across the Far East. Japan's prestige rose greatly as it came to be seen as a modern nation. Concurrently, Russia lost virtually its entire Pacific and Baltic fleets, and also much international esteem. This was particularly true in the eyes of Germany and Austria-Hungary before World War I. Russia was France's and Serbia's ally, and that loss of prestige had a significant effect on Germany's future when planning for war with France, and in supporting Austria-Hungary's war with Serbia.

In the absence of Russian competition, and with the distraction of European nations during World War I, combined with the Great Depression that followed, the Japanese military began efforts to dominate China and the rest of Asia, which eventually led to the Second Sino-Japanese War and the Pacific War theatres of World War II.

Effects on Russia 
Though there had been popular support for the war among the Russian public following the Japanese attack at Port Arthur in 1904, that popular support soon turned to discontent after suffering multiple defeats at the hands of the Japanese forces. For many Russians, the immediate shock of unexpected humiliation at the hands of Japan caused the conflict to be viewed as a metaphor for the shortcomings of the Romanov autocracy. Popular discontent in Russia after the war added more fuel to the already simmering Russian Revolution of 1905, an event Nicholas II had hoped to avoid entirely by taking intransigent negotiating stances prior to coming to the table. Twelve years later, that discontent boiled over into the February Revolution of 1917. In Poland, which Russia partitioned in the late 18th century, and where Russian rule already caused two major uprisings, the population was so restless that an army of 250,000–300,000—larger than the one facing the Japanese—had to be stationed to put down the unrest. Some political leaders of the Polish insurrection movement (in particular, Józef Piłsudski) sent emissaries to Japan to collaborate on sabotage and intelligence gathering within the Russian Empire and even plan a Japanese-aided uprising.

In Russia, the defeat of 1905 led in the short term to a reform of the Russian military that allowed it to face Germany in World War I. However, the revolts at home following the war planted seeds that presaged the Russian Revolution of 1917. This was because Tsar Nicholas II issued the October Manifesto, which included only limited reforms such as the Duma and failed to address the societal problems of Russia at the time.

Effects on Japan 
Japan had become the rising Asian power and had proven that its military could combat the major powers in Europe with success. Most Western powers were stunned that the Japanese not only prevailed but decisively defeated Russia. In the Russo-Japanese War, Japan had also portrayed a sense of readiness in taking a more active and leading role in Asian affairs, which in turn had led to widespread nationalism throughout the region.

Although the war had ended in a victory for Japan, Japanese public opinion was shocked by the very restrained peace terms which were negotiated at the war's end. Widespread discontent spread through the populace upon the announcement of the treaty terms, causing the Hibiya incendiary incident. Riots erupted in major cities in Japan following the incident, including demonstrations in front of the US Legation in Tokyo. Two specific requirements, expected after such a costly victory, were especially lacking: territorial gains and monetary reparations to Japan. The peace accord led to feelings of distrust, as the Japanese had intended to retain all of Sakhalin Island, but were forced to settle for half of it after being pressured by the United States, with President Roosevelt opting to support Nicholas II's stance on not ceding territory or paying reparations. The Japanese had wanted reparations to help families recover from lost fathers and sons as well as heavy taxation by the government to finance the war. Without them, they were at a loss.  The outcome of the Portsmouth peace negotiations, mediated by the U.S., was received by the general Japanese population with disbelief on September 5th and 6th when all the major newspapers reported the content of the signed treaty in lengthy editorials.

As a result, the wartime government, the First Katsura Cabinet, which remained in power for the longest period (1,681 days) in the history of Japanese democracy to date, declared Martial Law to suppress the riots on September 6th (one day after the official signing in Portsmouth, NH).  After over 2,000 people were arrested, the Martial Law was lifted on November 29th, but the Cabinet resigned on December 22nd, after ratifying the treaty on October 10th, as if taking the responsibility for a lost war.

Assessment

Historical significance 

The effects and impact of the Russo-Japanese War introduced a number of characteristics that came to define 20th-century politics and warfare. Many of the innovations brought by the Industrial Revolution, such as rapid-firing artillery and machine guns, as well as more accurate rifles, were first tested on a mass scale then. Military operations on both sea and land showed that modern warfare had undergone a considerable change since the Franco-Prussian War of 1870–71. Most army commanders had previously envisioned using these weapon systems to dominate the battlefield on an operational and tactical level but, as events played out, the technological advances forever altered the conditions of war too.

For East Asia this was the first confrontation after thirty years involving two modern armed forces.
The advanced weaponry led to massive casualty counts. Neither Japan nor Russia had prepared for the number of deaths that would occur in this new kind of warfare, or had the resources to compensate for such losses. This also left its impression on society at large, with the emergence of transnational and nongovernmental organizations, like the Red Cross, becoming prominent after the war. The consequent identification of common problems and challenges began the slow process that came to dominate much of the 20th century.

It has also been argued that the conflict had characteristics of what was later to be described as "total war". These included the mass mobilization of troops into battle and the need for so extensive a supply of equipment, armaments, and supplies that both domestic support and foreign aid were required. It is also argued that domestic response in Russia to the inefficiencies of the tsarist government set in motion the eventual dissolution of the Romanov dynasty.

Reception around the world 

To the Western powers, Japan's victory demonstrated the emergence of a new Asian regional power. With the Russian defeat, some scholars have argued that the war had set in motion a change in the global world order with the emergence of Japan as not only a regional power, but rather, the main Asian power. Rather more than the possibilities of diplomatic partnership were emerging, however. The US and Australian reaction to the changed balance of power brought by the war was mixed with fears of a Yellow Peril eventually shifting from China to Japan. American figures such as W. E. B. Du Bois and Lothrop Stoddard saw the victory as a challenge to western supremacy. This was reflected in Austria, where Baron Christian von Ehrenfels interpreted the challenge in racial as well as cultural terms, arguing that "the absolute necessity of a radical sexual reform for the continued existence of the western races of men has ... been raised from the level of discussion to the level of a scientifically proven fact". To stop the Japanese "Yellow Peril" would require drastic changes to society and sexuality in the West.

Certainly the Japanese success increased self-confidence among anti-colonial nationalists in colonised Asian countries – Vietnamese, Indonesians, Indians and Filipinos – and to those in declining countries like the Ottoman Empire and Persia in immediate danger of being absorbed by the Western powers. It also encouraged the Chinese who, despite having been at war with the Japanese only a decade before, still considered Westerners the greater threat. As Sun Yat-sen commented, "We regarded that Russian defeat by Japan as the defeat of the West by the East. We regarded the Japanese victory as our own victory". Even in far-off Tibet the war was a subject of conversation when Sven Hedin visited the Panchen Lama in February 1907. While for Jawaharlal Nehru, then only an aspiring politician in British India, "Japan's victory lessened the feeling of inferiority from which most of us suffered. A great European power had been defeated, thus Asia could still defeat Europe as it had done in the past." And in the Ottoman Empire too, the Committee of Union and Progress embraced Japan as a role model.

In Europe, subject populations were similarly encouraged. James Joyce's novel Ulysses, set in Dublin in 1904, contains hopeful Irish allusions as to the outcome of the war. And in partitioned Poland the artist Józef Mehoffer chose 1905 to paint his "Europa Jubilans" (Europe rejoicing), which portrays an aproned maid taking her ease on a sofa against a background of Eastern artefacts. Painted following demonstrations against the war and Russian cultural suppression, and in the year of Russia's defeat, its subtly coded message looks forward to a time when the Tsarist masters will be defeated in Europe as they had been in Asia.

The significance of the war for oppressed classes as well as subject populations was clear too to Socialist thinkers.

It was this realisation of the universal significance of the war that underlines the historical importance of the conflict and its outcome.

Military results 
Russia had lost two of its three fleets. Only its Black Sea Fleet remained, and this was the result of an earlier treaty that had prevented the fleet from leaving the Black Sea. Japan became the sixth-most powerful naval force by combined tonnage, while the Russian Navy declined to one barely stronger than that of Austria–Hungary. The actual costs of the war were large enough to affect the Russian economy and, despite grain exports, the nation developed an external balance of payments deficit. The cost of military re-equipment and re-expansion after 1905 pushed the economy further into deficit, although the size of the deficit was obscured.

The Japanese were on the offensive for most of the war and used massed infantry assaults against defensive positions, which would later become the standard of all European armies during World War I. The battles of the Russo-Japanese War, in which machine guns and artillery took a heavy toll on Russian and Japanese troops, were a precursor to the trench warfare of World War I. A German military advisor sent to Japan, Jakob Meckel, had a tremendous impact on the development of the Japanese military training, tactics, strategy, and organization. His reforms were credited with Japan's overwhelming victory over China in the First Sino-Japanese War of 1894–1895. However, his over-reliance on infantry in offensive campaigns also led to a large number of Japanese casualties.

Military and economic exhaustion affected both countries. Japanese historians regard this war as a turning point for Japan, and a key to understanding the reasons why Japan may have failed militarily and politically later. After the war, acrimony was felt at every level of Japanese society and it became the consensus within Japan that their nation had been treated as the defeated power during the peace conference. As time went on, this feeling, coupled with the sense of "arrogance" at becoming a Great Power, grew and added to growing Japanese hostility towards the West, and fuelled Japan's military and imperial ambitions. Furthermore, Japan's substantiated interests in Korea and Liaodong led to the creation of a Kwantung Army, which became an autonomous and increasingly powerful regional force. Only five years after the war, Japan de jure annexed Korea as part of its colonial empire. Two decades after that, the Kwantung Army staged an incident that led to the invasion of Manchuria in the Mukden Incident; the Kwantung Army eventually came to be heavily involved in the state's politics and administration, leading to a series of localized conflicts with Chinese regional warlords that finally extended into the Second Sino-Japanese War in 1937. As a result, most Chinese historians consider the Russo-Japanese War as a key development in Japan's spiral into militarism in the 1920s–30s.

Following the victory of the Battle of Tsushima, Japan's erstwhile British ally presented a lock of Admiral Nelson's hair to the Imperial Japanese Navy, judging its performance then as on a par with Britain's victory at Trafalgar in 1805. It is still on display at Kyouiku Sankoukan, a public museum maintained by the Japan Self-Defence Force. Nevertheless, there was a consequent shift in British strategic thinking, resulting in enlargement of its naval docks at Auckland, New Zealand; Bombay, British India; Fremantle and Sydney, Australia; Simon's Town, Cape Colony; Singapore and British Hong Kong. The naval war confirmed the direction of the British Admiralty's thinking in tactical terms even as it undermined its strategic grasp of a changing world. Tactical orthodoxy, for example, assumed that a naval battle would imitate the conditions of stationary combat and that ships would engage in one long line sailing on parallel courses; but more flexible tactical thinking would now be required as a firing ship and its target manoeuvred independently.

Military attachés and observers 

Military and civilian observers from every major power closely followed the course of the war. Most were able to report on events from the perspective of embedded positions within the land and naval forces of both Russia and Japan. These military attachés and other observers prepared first-hand accounts of the war and analytical papers. In-depth observer narratives of the war and more narrowly focused professional journal articles were written soon after the war; these post-war reports conclusively illustrated the battlefield destructiveness of this conflict. This was the first time the tactics of entrenched positions for infantry defended with machine guns and artillery became vitally important. Both would become dominant factors in World War I. Even though entrenched positions had already been a significant part of both the Franco-Prussian War and the American Civil War, it is now apparent that the high casualty counts, and the tactical lessons readily available to observer nations, were completely disregarded in preparations for war in Europe, and during much of the course of World War I.

In 1904–1905, Ian Standish Monteith Hamilton was the military attaché of the British Indian Army serving with the Imperial Japanese Army in Manchuria. As one of the several military attachés from Western countries, he was the first to arrive in Japan after the start of the war.
He therefore would be recognized as the dean of multi-national attachés and observers in this conflict, although out-ranked by British field marshal, William Gustavus Nicholson, 1st Baron Nicholson, who was later to become chief of the Imperial General Staff.

Economics 

Despite its gold reserves of 106.3 million pounds, Russia's pre-war financial situation was not enviable. The country had large budget deficits year after year, and was largely dependent on borrowed money.

Russia's war effort was funded primarily by France, in a series of loans totalling 800 million francs (£30.4 million); another loan in the amount of 600 million francs was agreed upon, but later cancelled. These loans were extended within a climate of mass bribing of the French press (made necessary by Russia's precarious economic and social situation and poor military performance). Although initially reluctant to participate in the war, the French government and major banks were co-operative since it became clear that Russian and French economic interests were tied. In addition to French money, Russia secured a loan in the amount of 500 million marks (£24.5 million) from Germany, who also financed Japan's war effort.

Japan's pre-war gold reserves were a modest £11.7 million; a major portion of the total cost of the war was covered by money borrowed from the United Kingdom, Canada, and the United States. During his canvassing expedition in London, the Japanese vice-governor of the Bank of Japan Takahashi Korekiyo met Jacob Schiff, an American banker and head of Kuhn, Loeb & Co. Schiff, in response to Russia's anti-Jewish pogroms and sympathetic to Japan's cause, extended a critical series of loans to the Empire of Japan, in the amount of 200 million US dollars (£41.2 million). He also raised loans from the Rothschild family in Britain. Japan's total war expenditure was 2,150 million yen, of which 38%, or 820 million yen, was raised overseas.

List of battles 

 8 February 1904: Battle of Port Arthur: naval battle, inconclusive
 9 February 1904: Battle of Chemulpo Bay: naval battle, Japanese victory
 30 April-1 May 1904: Battle of Yalu River, Japanese victory
 25–26 May 1904: Battle of Nanshan: Japanese victory
 14–15 June 1904: Battle of Te-li-Ssu: Japanese victory
 17 July 1904: Battle of Motien Pass: Japanese victory
 24 July 1904: Battle of Tashihchiao: Japanese victory
 31 July 1904: Battle of Hsimucheng: Japanese victory
 10 August 1904: Battle of the Yellow Sea,: naval battle, Japanese victory
 14 August 1904: Battle off Ulsan: naval battle, Japanese victory
 20 August 1904: Battle of Korsakov: naval battle, Japanese victory
 19 August 1904 – 2 January 1905: Siege of Port Arthur, Japanese victory
 25 August-3 September 1904: Battle of Liaoyang: Japanese victory
 5–17 October 1904 Battle of Shaho: Inconclusive
 26–27 January 1905: Battle of Sandepu: Inconclusive
 21 February-10 March 1905: Battle of Mukden: Japanese victory
 27–28 May 1905: Battle of Tsushima: naval battle, Japanese victory
 7–31 July 1905: Invasion of Sakhalin: Japanese victory

Cultural legacy

Visual arts 

The Russo-Japanese War was covered by dozens of foreign journalists who sent back sketches that were turned into lithographs and other reproducible forms. Propaganda images were circulated by both sides, often in the form of postcards and based on insulting racial stereotypes. These were produced not only by the combatants but by those from European countries who supported one or the other side or had a commercial or colonial stake in the area. War photographs were also popular, appearing in both the press and in book form.

In Russia, the war was covered by anonymous satirical graphic luboks for sale in markets, recording the war for the domestic audience. Around 300 were made before their creation was banned by the Russian government. Their Japanese equivalents were woodblock prints. These had been common during the Sino-Japanese war a decade earlier and celebrations of the new conflict tended to repeat the same imagery and situations. But by this time in Japan postcards had become the most common form of communication and they soon replaced prints as a medium for topographical imagery and war reportage. In some ways, however, they were still dependent on the print for their pictorial conventions, not least in issuing the cards in series that assembled into a composite scene or design, either as diptychs, triptychs or even more ambitious formats. However, captioning swiftly moved from the calligraphic side inscription to a printed title below, and not just in Japanese but in English and other European languages. There was a lively sense that these images served not only as mementoes but also as propaganda statements.

War artists were to be found on the Russian side and even figured among the casualties. Vasily Vereshchagin went down with the Petropavlovsk, Admiral Makarov's flagship, when it was sunk by mines. However, his last work, a picture of a council of war presided over by the admiral, was recovered almost undamaged. Another artist, Mykola Samokysh, first came to notice for his reports during the war and the paintings worked up from his diary sketch-books. Other depictions appeared after the event.  The two by the Georgian naïve painter Niko Pirosmani from 1906 must have been dependent on newspaper reports since he was not present. Then, in 1914 at the outset of World War I, Yury Repin made an episode during the Battle of Yalu River the subject of a broad heroic canvas.

Music 
On either side, there were lyrics lamenting the necessity of fighting in a foreign land, far from home. One of the earliest of several Russian songs still performed today was the waltz "Amur's Waves" (Amurskie volny), which evokes the melancholy of standing watch on the motherland far east frontier.

Two others grew out of incidents during the war. "On the Hills of Manchuria" (Na sopkah Manchzhurii; 1906) is another waltz composed by Ilya Shatrov, a decorated military musician whose regiment suffered badly in the Battle of Mukden. Originally only the music was published, and the words by Stepan Petrov were added later.

The second song, "Variag", commemorates the Battle of Chemulpo Bay in which that cruiser and the gunboat Korietz steamed out to confront an encircling Japanese squadron rather than surrender. That act of heroism was first celebrated in a German song by Rudolf Greintz in 1907, which was quickly translated into Russian and sung to a martial accompaniment. These lyrics mourned the fallen lying in their graves and threatened revenge.

Nikolai Rimsky-Korsakov also reacted to the war by composing the satirical opera The Golden Cockerel, completed in 1907. Although it was ostensibly based on a verse fairy tale by Alexander Pushkin written in 1834, the authorities quickly realised its true target and immediately banned it from performance. The opera was premiered in 1909, after Rimsky-Korsakov's death, and even then with modifications required by the censors.

Poetry 
Some Japanese poetry dealing with the war still has a high profile. General Nogi Maresuke's "Outside the Goldland fortress" was learned by generations of schoolchildren and valued for its bleak stoicism. The army surgeon Mori Ōgai kept a verse diary which tackled such themes as racism, strategic mistakes and the ambiguities of victory which can now be appreciated in historical hindsight. Nowadays too there is growing appreciation of Yosano Akiko's parting poem to her brother as he left for the war, which includes the critical lines.

Even the Emperor Meiji himself entered the poetic lists, writing in answer to all the lamentations about death in a foreign land that the patriotic soul returns to the homeland.

European treatments were similarly varied. Jane H. Oakley attempted an epic treatment of the conflict in 86 cantos. The French poet Blaise Cendrars was later to represent himself as on a Russian train on its way to Manchuria at the time in his La prose du Transsibérien et de la Petite Jehanne de France (1913) and energetically evoked the results of the war along the way:

Much later, the Scottish poet Douglas Dunn devoted an epistolary poem in verse to the naval war in The Donkey's Ears: Politovsky's Letters Home (2000). This follows the voyage of the Russian Imperial Navy flagship Kniaz to its sinking at the Battle of Tsushima.

Fiction 
Fictional coverage of the war in English began even before it was over. An early example was Allen Upward's The International Spy. Set in both Russia and Japan, it ends with the Dogger Bank incident involving the Baltic Fleet. The political thinking displayed there is typical of the time. There is great admiration for the Japanese, who were British allies. Russia is in turmoil, but the main impetus towards war is not imperialism as such but commercial forces. "Every student of modern history has remarked the fact that all recent wars have been promoted by great combinations of capitalists. The causes which formerly led to war between nation and nation have ceased to operate" (p. 40). The true villain plotting in the background, however, is the German Emperor, seeking to destabilise the European balance of power in his country's favour. Towards the end of the novel, the narrator steals a German submarine and successfully foils a plot to involve the British in the war. The submarine motif reappeared in George Griffith's science fiction novel, The Stolen Submarine (1904), although in this case it is a French super-submarine which its developer sells to the Russians for use against the Japanese in another tale of international intrigue.

Though most English-language fiction of the period took the Japanese side, the Rev. W. W. Walker's Canadian novella, Alter Ego, is an exception. It features a Canadian volunteer in the Russian army who, on his return, agrees to talk about his experiences to an isolated upcountry community and relates his part in the Battle of Mukden. Though this incident only occupies two of the book's six chapters, it is used to illustrate the main message there, that war is "anti-Christian and barbarous, except in a defensive sense" (Ch.3).

Various aspects of the war were also common in contemporary children's fiction. Categorised as Boys' Own adventure stories, they offer few insights into the conflict, being generally based on news articles and sharing without any reflection in the contemporary culture of imperialism. Among these, Herbert Strang was responsible for two novels: Kobo told from the Japanese side, and Brown of Moukden viewed from the Russian side. Three more were written by the prolific American author, Edward Stratemeyer: Under the Mikado's Flag, At the Fall of Port Arthur, and Under Togo for Japan, or Three Young Americans on Land and Sea (1906). Two other English-language stories begin with the action at Port Arthur and follow the events thereafter: A Soldier of Japan: a tale of the Russo-Japanese War by Captain Frederick Sadleir Brereton, and The North Pacific by Willis Boyd Allen (1855–1938). Two more also involve young men fighting in the Japanese navy: Americans in For the Mikado by Kirk Munroe, and a temporarily disgraced English officer in Under the Ensign of the Rising Sun by Harry Collingwood, the pen-name of William Joseph Cosens Lancaster (1851–1922), whose speciality was naval fiction.

Another literary genre affected by the outcome of the war was invasion literature, either fuelled by racialist fears or generated by the international power struggle. Shunrō Oshikawa's novel The Submarine Battleship (Kaitei Gunkan) was published in 1900 before the actual fighting began but shared the imperial tensions that produced it. It is the story of an armoured ram-armed submarine involved in a Russo-Japanese conflict. Three other novels appeared in 1908 and are thought of as significant now because of their prophetic dimension. American author Arthur Wellesley Kipling (1885–1947) prefaced his The New Dominion – A Tale of Tomorrow's Wars with a note counselling future vigilance. The scenario there is an attack by German and Japanese allies which the US and British navies victoriously fend off. In Germany itself an air attack on the American fleet is described by Ferdinand Heinrich Grautoff (1871–1935), writing under the name Parabellum, in his novel Banzai!. Published in Berlin in 1908, it was translated into English the following year. An Australian author using the pseudonym Charles H. Kirmess first serialised his The Commonwealth Crisis and then revised it for book publication as The Australian Crisis in 1909. It is set in 1912 and told from the standpoint of 1922, following a military invasion of Australia's Northern Territory and colonisation by Japanese settlers.

Most Russian fictional accounts of the war had a documentary element. Alexey Novikov-Priboy served in the Baltic Fleet and wrote about the conflict on his return, but his early work was suppressed. It was not until the changed political climate under Soviet rule that he began writing his historical epic Tsushima, based on his own experiences on board the battleship  as well as on testimonies of fellow sailors and government archives. The first part was published in 1932, the second in 1935, and the whole novel was later awarded the Stalin Prize. It describes the heroism of Russian sailors and certain officers whose defeat, in accordance with the new Soviet thinking, was due to the criminal negligence of the Imperial Naval command. A German novel by Frank Thiess, originally published as Tsushima in 1936 (and later translated as The Voyage of Forgotten Men), covered the same journey round the world to defeat.

Later there appeared a first-hand account of the siege of Port Arthur by Alexander Stepanov (1892–1965). He had been present there as the 12-year-old son of a battery commander and his novel, Port Arthur: a historical narrative (1944), is based on his own diaries and his father's notes. The work is considered one of the best historical novels of the Soviet period. A later novel in which the war appears is Valentin Pikul's The Three Ages of Okini-San (1981). Centred on the life of Vladimir Kokovtsov, who rose through the ranks to admiral of the Russian fleet, it covers the period from the Russo-Japanese War through to the February and October Revolutions. A much later Russian genre novel uses the period of the war as background. This is Boris Akunin's The Diamond Chariot (2003), in the first part of which the detective Erast Fandorin is charged with protecting the Trans-Siberian Railway from Japanese sabotage.

The main historical novel dealing with the war from the Japanese side is Shiba Ryōtarō's Clouds Above the Hill, published serially in several volumes between 1968 and 1972, and translated in English in 2013. The closely researched story spans the decade from the Sino-Japanese War to the Russo-Japanese War and went on to become the nation's favourite book.

Filmography 

 Port Arthur (1936)
 Kreiser Varyag (1946)
 Nichiro sensō shōri no hishi: Tekichū ōdan sanbyaku-ri (1957)
 Meiji tennô to nichiro daisenso (1958)
 The Battle of the Japan Sea (1969, Nihonkai-Daikaisen) depicts the naval battles of the war, the attacks on the Port Arthur highlands, and the subterfuge and diplomacy of Japanese agents in Sweden. Admiral Togo is portrayed by Toshiro Mifune.
 The Battle of Tsushima (1975) documentary, depiction of the naval Battle of Tsushima
 The Battle of Port Arthur (1980, sometimes referred as 203 Kochi), depiction of the Siege of Port Arthur
 Nihonkai daikaisen: Umi yukaba (1983)
 Reilly, Ace of Spies (1983). Russian-born British spy Sidney Reilly's role in providing intelligence that allowed the Japanese surprise attack that started the Siege of Port Arthur is dramatised in the second episode of this TV series.
 Saka no Ue no Kumo, of which the third series dealt with the war period (December 2011)
 Golden Kamuy (2018), an anime adaptation of the manga of the same name. The story takes place just after the Russo-Japanese War, and features many flashbacks and references to it. Several of its principal characters are veteran Japanese army men who fought in the Siege of Port Arthur.
 The Prisoner of Sakura (2019, Sorokin no mita saka, V plenu u sakury), a joint Japan-Russia co-production, which was based on the true story of a prison camp in Matsuyama, Ehime Prefecture, during the war. The movie is centered around the romance between a Russian officer, a prisoner of war, and a Japanese nurse who find themselves on opposing sides of the war.

See also 

 Foreign policy of the Russian Empire
 Kaneko Kentarō
 Outline of war
 List of warships sunk during the Russo-Japanese War
 Manchuria under Qing rule
 Baron Rosen
 Russian Imperialism in Asia and the Russo-Japanese War
 Western imperialism in Asia

References

Bibliography 

 
 
 
 
  online 
  In 
 
 
 
 
 
 Kowner, Rotem.  Historical Dictionary of the Russo-Japanese War, also published as The A to Z of the Russo-Japanese War  (2009) excerpt 
 
  In .
 
 
 
 
 
  In .

Further reading 

 Corbett, Sir Julian. Maritime Operations in the Russo-Japanese War 1904–1905. (1994) Originally classified, and in two volumes, .
 Dower, John W., Throwing off Asia III, Woodblock prints of the Russo-Japanese War, 2008, MIT Visualizing Cultures 
 Hall, Richard C. "The Next War: The Influence of the Russo-Japanese War on Southeastern Europe and the Balkan Wars of 1912–1913." Journal of Slavic Military Studies 17.3 (2004): 563–577.
 Hough, Richard A. The Fleet That Had To Die. Ballantine Books. (1960).
 Japanese Ministry of Foreign Affairs, Correspondence Regarding the Negotiations between Japan and Russia (1903–1904), Presented to the Imperial Diet, March 1904 (Tokyo, 1904)
 Jentschura, Hansgeorg; Dieter Jung, Peter Mickel. Warships of the Imperial Japanese Navy, 1869–1945. United States Naval Institute, Annapolis, Maryland, 1977. Originally published in German as Die Japanischen Kreigschiffe 1869–1945 in 1970, translated into English by David Brown and Antony Preston. .
 Kowner, Rotem (2006). Historical Dictionary of the Russo-Japanese War. Scarecrow. .
 Matsumura Masayoshi, Ian Ruxton (trans.), Baron Kaneko and the Russo-Japanese War (1904–05), Lulu Press 2009 
 Murray, Nicholas (2013). The Rocky Road to the Great War: the Evolution of Trench Warfare to 1914. Dulles, Virginia, Potomac Books 
 Morris, Edmund (2002). Theodore Rex, Google Books . New York: Random House. 
 Nish, Ian Hill. (1985). The Origins of the Russo-Japanese War. London: Longman. 
 Novikov-Priboy, Aleksei. Tsushima. London: George Allen & Unwin Ltd. (1936).
 Okamoto, Shumpei (1970). The Japanese Oligarchy and the Russo-Japanese War. Columbia University Press.
 
 
 Pleshakov, Constantine. The Tsar's Last Armada: The Epic Voyage to the Battle of Tsushima. . (2002).
 Podalko, Petr E. "'Weak ally'or 'strong enemy?': Japan in the eyes of Russian diplomats and military agents, 1900–1907." Japan Forum 28#3 (2016).
 
 
 
 Tomitch, V. M. Warships of the Imperial Russian Navy. Volume 1, Battleships. (1968).

Illustrations
 Gerbig-Fabel, Marco. "Photographic artefacts of war 1904–1905: the Russo-Japanese war as transnational media event." European Review of History—Revue européenne d'histoire 15.6 (2008): 629–642.
 Saaler, Sven und Inaba Chiharu (Hg.). Der Russisch-Japanische Krieg 1904/05 im Spiegel deutscher Bilderbogen, Deutsches Institut für Japanstudien Tokyo, (2005).
 Sharf, Frederick A. and James T. Ulak, eds. A Well-Watched War: Images from the Russo-Japanese Front, 1904–1905 (Newbury, MA, 2000), the catalogue of the show at the Sackler Gallery in Washington, DC,

Historiography
 Hamby, Joel E. "Striking the Balance: Strategy and Force in the Russo-Japanese War." Armed Forces & Society 30.3 (2004): 325–356.
 Seager, Robert. Alfred Thayer Mahan: The Man And His Letters. (1977) .
 van der Oye, David Schimmelpenninck. "Rewriting the Russo-Japanese War: A Centenary Retrospective." The Russian Review 67.1 (2008): 78–87. online
 
 Won-soo, Kim. "Trends in the Study of the Russo-Japanese War in Korea and Future Tasks-Third-party perspective on the origins of the war." International Journal of Korean History 7 (2005): 1–28. online

External links 

 
 
 RussoJapaneseWar.com , Russo-Japanese War research society.
 BFcollection.net, Database of Russian Army Jewish soldiers injured, killed, or missing in action from the war.
 BYU.edu, Text of the Treaty of Portsmouth:.
 Flot.com, Russian Navy history of war.
 Frontiers.loc.gov, Russo-Japanese Relations in the Far East. Meeting of Frontiers (Library of Congress)
 CSmonitor.com, Treaty of Portsmouth now seen as global turning point from the Christian Science Monitor, by Robert Marquand, 30 December 2005.
 
 Stanford.edu, Lyrics, translation and melody of the song "On the hills of Manchuria" (Na sopkah Manchzhurii).
 Google Map with battles of Russo-Japanese War and other important events.
 See more Russo-Japanese War Maps at the Persuasive Cartography, The PJ Mode Collection, Cornell University Library

 
1904 in Japan
1904 in the Russian Empire
1905 in Japan
1905 in the Russian Empire
Conflicts in 1904
Conflicts in 1905
History of Korea
History of Manchuria
Wars involving Japan
Wars involving Russia
Wars involving the Russian Empire
Japan–Russia military relations
Military history of Liaoning